Another Story is an album by American country singer Ernest Tubb, released in 1967 (see 1967 in music). It is out of print.

Track listing
"In the Jailhouse Now" (Jimmie Rodgers)
"Another Story" (Arlie Duff)
"Lots of Luck" (Roger Miller)
"Apartment No. 9" (Johnny Paycheck, Bobby Austin)
"Loose Talk" (Freddie Hart, Ann Lucas)
"Yesterday's Winner Is a Loser Today" (Ernest Tubb, Jesse Rogers, Jimmie Skinner)
"Taking It Easy Here" (Ernie Lee)
"You Beat All I Ever Saw" (Johnny Cash)
"Waltz Across Texas" (Talmadge Tubb)
"I Never Had the One I Wanted" (Claude Gray, Jimmy Louis, Sheb Wooley)
"There's No Room in My Heart" (Fred Rose, Zeb Turner)
"Bring Your Heart Home" (Tom T. Hall)

Personnel
Ernest Tubb – vocals, guitar
Leon Rhodes – guitar
Jerry Shook – guitar, bass
Harold Bradley – bass
Cal Smith – guitar
Steve Chapman – guitar
Buddy Charleton – pedal steel guitar
Jack Drake – bass
Len Miller – drums
Hargus "Pig" Robbins – piano
Bill Pursell – piano

Chart positions

References

Ernest Tubb albums
1967 albums
Albums produced by Owen Bradley
Decca Records albums